The savanna nightjar,  sometimes also allied nightjar or Franklin's nightjar,  (Caprimulgus affinis) is a species of nightjar found in South and Southeast Asia. Eight subspecies are recognised: C. a. monticolus, C. a. amoyensis, C. a. stictomus, C. a. affinis, C. a. timorensis, C. a. griseatus, C. a. mindanensis and C. a. propinquus. Its habitat is open forest and areas with scrub. The upperparts are brownish-grey and vermiculated, with pale brown speckles. The underparts are brown, with bars. The savanna nightjar is nocturnal and is recognizable by its characteristic loud chirping calls, mainly given in flight during the evening. Their acoustic features change and can preadapt based upon their habitat. The IUCN Red List has assessed the species to be of least concern because it has a large range and its population trend is stable.

References

savanna nightjar
Birds of South China
Birds of South Asia
Birds of Southeast Asia
Birds of Taiwan
savanna nightjar
Taxa named by Thomas Horsfield